Edward Heath (1819–1892) was mayor of New Orleans from March 28, 1867, to June 10, 1868. His tenure came during the Reconstruction of Louisiana, and required a stronger personality than he brought to the office. During his term, he faced budgetary and racial problems as well as the continued interference of the military authorities of the U. S. Federal government. He was the first Republican mayor of New Orleans and, along with Benjamin Flanders, one of the only two.

External links

Heath's Administration (in Kendall's History of New Orleans)
article on him

1819 births
1892 deaths
Mayors of New Orleans
19th-century American politicians